James Maitland, 9th Earl of Lauderdale (12 May 1784 – 22 August 1860), styled Viscount Maitland between 1789 and 1839, was a British peer and Whig politician.

Background and education
Lauderdale was the son of James Maitland, 8th Earl of Lauderdale, and Eleanor, daughter of Anthony Todd. He was educated at Eton and the University of Edinburgh.

Political career
Lauderdale sat as Member of Parliament for Camelford from 1806 to 1807, for Richmond, Yorkshire, from 1818 to 1820 and for Appleby from 1828 to 1832. In 1839 he succeeded his father in the earldom and entered the House of Lords. He also served as Lord Lieutenant of Berwickshire between 1841 and 1860.

Family

Lord Lauderdale died at Thirlestane Castle, Berwickshire, in August 1860, aged 76. He was unmarried and was succeeded in the earldom by his younger brother, Admiral Sir Anthony Maitland.

References

External links 
 

1784 births
1860 deaths
People educated at Eton College
Earls of Lauderdale
Members of the Parliament of the United Kingdom for English constituencies
UK MPs 1806–1807
UK MPs 1818–1820
UK MPs 1826–1830
UK MPs 1830–1831
UK MPs 1831–1832
UK MPs who inherited peerages
Members of the Parliament of the United Kingdom for constituencies in Cornwall